The Deniliquin Independent, also published as The Independent, was a weekly English language newspaper published in Deniliquin, New South Wales, Australia.

History
The Deniliquin Independent was published between 1899 and 1947, when it was absorbed into the Pastoral Times. Another newspaper published in Deniliquin from 1899, the Riverine Journal, was incorporated into the  Deniliquin Independent in 1901.

Digitisation
The paper has been digitised as part of the Australian Newspapers Digitisation Program project of the National Library of Australia.

See also
 List of newspapers in New South Wales 
 List of newspapers in Australia

References

External links
 

Defunct newspapers published in New South Wales
Publications disestablished in 1947
Newspapers established in 1899
Newspapers on Trove